Auguste Henri Brincourt (June 25, 1823 - August 10, 1909) was a General of the French Army. He notably served during the French Intervention in Mexico and the Franco-Prussian War and was a recipient of the Grand Cross of the Légion d'honneur.

1823 births
1909 deaths
French generals
French military personnel of the Second French intervention in Mexico
French military personnel of the Crimean War
French military personnel of the Franco-Prussian War
Grand Croix of the Légion d'honneur